Airborne early warning and control (AEW&C) aircraft are airborne radar systems designed to detect and track aircraft, missiles, ships and vehicles and provide command and control to direct friendly forces. Some operators, such as the Royal Air Force refer to such aircraft as Airborne early warning (AEW), while others reserve the shorter name for AEW aircraft lacking command and control facilities.

Current AEW&C operators

Turkish Air Forces operate 4 AWACs of their own.

Future operators

Historical AEW operators

See also
 List of airborne early warning aircraft

Notes

Footnotes

Citations

References

 
  
 

 
 
Eyes in the Skies – All the World's AWACS, Air Forces Monthly magazine, August 2008 issue.

 
AEWandC aircraft operators
AEWandC
AEWandC Aircraft Operators